Chris Paterson (born 15 October 1980) is a former professional rugby league footballer who played for the Wests Tigers.

External links
RLP Profile

1980 births
Living people
Australian rugby league players
Wests Tigers players
Western Suburbs Magpies NSW Cup players
Rugby league props
Rugby league players from Mackay, Queensland